Fengtai South railway station is a railway station on the Shangqiu–Hangzhou high-speed railway in  Fengtai County, Huainan, Anhui, China.

References

Railway stations in Anhui
Railway stations in China opened in 2019